Beilschmiedia tawa, the tawa, is a New Zealand broadleaf tree common in the central parts of the country. Tawa is often the dominant canopy tree species in lowland forests in the North Island and the north east of the South Island, but will also often form the subcanopy in primary forests throughout the country in these areas, beneath podocarps such as kahikatea, matai, miro and rimu. Individual specimens may grow up to 30 metres or more in height with trunks up to 1.2 metres in diameter, and they have smooth dark bark. The Māori word "tawa" is the name for the tree.

Tawa produce small inconspicuous flowers followed by 2–3.5 cm long fruit of a dark red plum colour. With such large fruits, tawa is notable for the fact that it relies solely on the New Zealand pigeon (kererū) and (where present) the North Island kokako for dispersal of its seed.  These are the only remaining birds from New Zealand's original biota large enough to eat the fruits of this tree and pass the seeds through their guts and excrete them unharmed. Tawa can also support significant epiphyte gardens in their canopies, which are one of the few habitats known to be frequented by the enigmatic, arboreal striped skink.

This tree gives its name to a northern suburb of Wellington, Tawa.

Uses
 The wood of this tree can be used for attractive and resilient floorboarding. Although largely protected in conservation areas and by robust environmental legislation, licences are occasionally granted for the odd fallen tree to be milled for its timber.

The kernel of the tawa berry was used by Māori as food. The berries were steamed in a hangi (earth oven) for two days, then washed to remove the turpentine-flavoured pulp. The dried kernels were stored. When required, they were soaked in hot water and pounded, sometimes flavouring being added to the mashed meal.

See also
Beilschmiedia tarairi (taraire)

References 

H.H. Allan, 1961. Flora of New Zealand Vol. 1. Government printer.
J. Dawson and R. Lucas, 2000. Nature guide to the New Zealand Forest. Godwit.
W. Mary McEwen, 1978.
A. E. Wright, 1984.

External links

tawa
Flora of the North Island
Flora of the South Island
Trees of New Zealand